Campoplex is a genus of parasitic wasps in the tribe Campoplegini.

Taxonomy
Former species
  Dusona elegans (as Campoplex elegans)

References

External links 
 
 

Ichneumonidae genera
Campopleginae